Vendsyssel Håndbold  was a handball club from Frederikshavn, Denmark. Vendssysel Håndbold competed in the women's Danish 1st Division, until February 2022. The home arena of the club was DRINX Arena in a small town, outside of Sæby, called Syvsten.

It was announced in February 2022, that the club had filed for bankruptcy and the players contracts would be dissolved. The team's placement and points in the Danish 1st Division would also be canceled. The club's licence was thus handed over to the parent club Frederikshavn FI, which was also relegated to the 3rd division in the 2022/23 season.

Arena 
 Name: DRINX Arena
 City: Syvsten, Denmark
 Capacitu: 600 spectators
 Address: Idræts Allé 3, 9930 Sæby

Kits

Team

Current squad
Squad for the 2021–22 season.

Goalkeepers
 1  Jesse van de Polder
 16  Johanne Graugaard
Wingers
LW 
 8  Elsa Åsberg
RW
 15  Line Grønning Jensen

Line players
 6  Christina Hansen
 14  Rikke Dahl Nielsen
 
Back players
LB
 9  Marita Mortensen
 18  Sofie Hartung Sletskov
 23  Sofie Lassen
CB
 5  Mathilde Bo Hald
 19  Mette Brandt Nielsen
 26  Christina Pedersen
RB
 11  Sara Jakobsen Madsen

TransfersTransfers for the 2022-23 season''

Joining

Leaving
  Jesse van de Polder (GK) (to   Holstebro Håndbold)
  Johanne Graugaard (GK) (to   EH Aalborg)
  Elsa Åsberg (LW) (to   H 65 Höör)
  Sofie Hartung Sletskov (LB) (to   EH Aalborg)
  Sofie Lassen (LB) (to   EH Aalborg)
  Mette Brandt Nielsen (CB) (to   Randers HK)
  Christina Pedersen (CB) (to   HH Elite)
  Sara Jakobsen Hansen (RB) (to   Hadsten Sports Klub Håndbold)
  Rikke Dahl Nielsen (P) (to   Aalborg HK)
  Christina Hansen (P) (to   Aarhus United)

  Marita Mortensen (LB)
  Mathilde Bo Hald (CB)
  Line Grønning Jensen (RW)

Notable players 
 Mariana Costa
 Larissa Araújo
 Kristina Bille
 Lærke Christensen
 Anja Kristensen
 Nadja Lærke
 Kristina Logvin
 Tanja Logwin
 Silje Aastrøm
 Ann-Helen Adolfsen
 Pia Harstad
 Klaudia Gjorgievska
 Zorica Mihajlova
 Asahi Kasuya

Notable coaches 
 Lars Rasmussen
 Tatjana Logwin

Kit manufacturers
 Craft (2019-2022)

References

External links
 Official website

Danish handball clubs
Frederikshavn Municipality
2011 establishments in Denmark